Lawsuits against God have occurred in real life and in fiction. Issues debated in the actions include the problem of evil and harmful "acts of God".

Actual suits

Betty Penrose 
In 1969, Arizonan lawyer Russel T. Tansie filed a suit against God on behalf of his secretary, Betty Penrose, seeking $100,000 in damages. Penrose blamed God for his "negligence" in allowing a lightning bolt to strike her house.

Ernie Chambers 

In the U.S. state of Nebraska, State Senator Ernie Chambers filed a suit in 2008 against God, seeking a permanent injunction against God's harmful activities, as an effort to publicize the issue of public access to the court system. The suit was dismissed because God could not be properly notified, not having a fixed address. The Judge stated, "Given that this court finds that there can never be service effectuated on the named defendant this action will be dismissed with prejudice". The senator, assuming God to be singular and all-knowing, responded "The court itself acknowledges the existence of God. A consequence of that acknowledgement is a recognition of God's omniscience, Since God knows everything, God has notice of this lawsuit."

Nebraska media inaccurately reported that Chambers filed the lawsuit in response to another lawsuit that he considered to be frivolous and inappropriate. Chambers clarified that, on the contrary, his intention was to demonstrate that no lawsuit should be considered frivolous. By suing God he "emphasized that attempts by the Legislature to prohibit the filing of any lawsuit would run afoul of the Nebraska Constitution's guarantee that the doors to the courthouse must be open to everyone."

In response to Chambers' case, two responses were filed. The first was from a Corpus Christi lawyer, Eric Perkins, who wanted to answer the question "what would God say". The second was filed in Douglas County, Nebraska District Court. The source of the second response, claiming to be from God, is unclear as no contact information was given.

On July 30, 2008, local media sources reported the Douglas County District Court was going to deny Chambers' lawsuit because Chambers had failed to notify the defendant. However, on August 1, Chambers was granted a court date of August 5 in order to proceed with his lawsuit. "The scheduling hearing will give me a chance to lay out the facts that would justify the granting of the motion," Chambers was quoted as saying. He added, "Once the court enters the injunction, that's as much as I can do ... That's as much as I would ask the court. I wouldn't expect them to enforce it."

However, a judge finally did throw out the case, saying the Almighty was not properly served due to his unlisted home address.  As of November 5, 2008, Chambers filed an appeal to the Nebraska Supreme Court. The former state senator John DeCamp and E. O. Augustsson in Sweden, asked to represent God. Augustsson's letters, mentioning the Bjorn (cf. the Bjorn Socialist Republic) were stricken as "frivolous". The Appeals Court gave Chambers until February 24 to show that he notified DeCamp and Augustsson of his brief, which he did. The case was finally closed on February 25 when the Nebraska Court of Appeals dismissed the appeal and vacated the order of the district court. The court quoted cases according to which "[a] court decides real controversies and determines rights actually controverted, and does not address or dispose of abstract questions or issues that might arise in hypothetical or fictitious situation or setting".

Pavel M. 
In 2005, a Romanian prisoner identified as Pavel M., serving 20 years after being convicted of murder, filed a lawsuit against the Romanian Orthodox Church, as God's representatives in Romania, for failing to keep him from the Devil, essentially stating that his baptism had been a binding contract.

The suit was dismissed because the defendant, God, was neither an individual nor a company, and was therefore not subject to the civil court of law's jurisdiction.

Chandan Kumar Singh 
Chandan Kumar Singh, a lawyer from Bihar, India, sued the Hindu god Rama for mistreating his wife, the goddess Sita.

Fictional suits 
In the Australian comedy film The Man Who Sued God (2001), a fisherman played by Billy Connolly successfully challenges the right of insurance companies to refuse payment for a destroyed boat on the common legal exemption clause of an act of God. In a suit against the world's religious institutions as God's representatives on Earth, the religious institutions face the dilemma of either having to state God does not exist to uphold the legal principle, or being held liable for damages caused by acts of God.

An Indian film, OMG – Oh My God! (2012), has a protagonist Kanji Mehta (played by Paresh Rawal) file a lawsuit against God when his shop is destroyed in an earthquake and the insurance company refuses to take his claim, stating that "act of God" is not covered under his insurance policy. The Telugu film Gopala Gopala is a remake of this, as is the 2016 Kannada-language Mukunda Murari.

In the Fyodor Dostoyevsky novel The Brothers Karamazov (1880), one of the characters tells the story of a grand inquisitor in Spain who meets an incarnation of Jesus, interrogates him and exiles him.

Former Auschwitz concentration camp inmate Elie Wiesel is said to have witnessed three Jewish prisoners try God in absentia for abandoning the Jewish people during the Holocaust. From this experience, Wiesel wrote the play and novel The Trial of God (1979). It is set in a Ukrainian village during 1649 after a massacre of the Jewish inhabitants, possibly as part of the Khmelnytsky Uprising. In the play, three traveling minstrels arrive in the village, having intended to perform a play. Instead they perform a mock trial of God for allowing the massacre. The verdict is innocent, after a stirring lone defence by a stranger who, in a twist, is revealed to be the Devil.

The television play God on Trial (2008), written by Frank Cottrell Boyce, depicts a scene similar to that attributed to Elie Wiesel, but is also described by Boyce as "apocryphal". In it, three Auschwitz prisoners sue God. The trial returns a guilty verdict, although with likely reasons for appeal.

See also 
 A Contract with God, a short story collection: in the title story, a man struggles with the events of his life in light of what he believes to be a contract with God. 
 God in the Dock, an anthology of C. S. Lewis' Christian apologetics expressing his contention that modern human beings, rather than considering themselves as being judged by God, prefer to try God while acting as his judge
 Last Judgment
 Lawsuits against the Devil
 Legalism (theology), the view that obedience to law, not faith in God's grace, is the pre-eminent principle of redemption
 Levi Yitzchok of Berditchev, known as the "defense attorney" for the Jewish people, because it was believed that he could intercede with God on their behalf
 Misotheism, hatred of God
 Religious law
 Sanhedrin trial of Jesus, the Biblical account of Jesus' trial before the Sanhedrin council

References

External links 
 
 
 

Abuse of the legal system
Lawsuits against God